Caroline Lucia Maria (Caro) Dahl (née Peter; 17 October 1890 – 21 January 1979) was a Norwegian tennis player, born in Istanbul.

She competed in women's singles at the 1920 Summer Olympics in Antwerp, where she tied 9th. At the 1924 Summer Olympics in Paris, she competed in both women's singles and mixed doubles (with Conrad Langaard).

Personal life
Dahl was born in Istanbul, the daughter of Silvie Pessi (1863–1939) and businessman Joachim Peter (died 1891). As her father died the year after her birth, the family eventually left Istanbul and Dahl grew up in Zürich. In 1913 she married Knud Dahl, who graduated as engineer in Zürich the same year. From 1915 to 1917 she lived with her husband in the United States, and thereafter in Oslo. She died in Oslo on 21 January 1979.

References

External links

1890 births
1979 deaths
Sportspeople from Istanbul
Norwegian female tennis players
Olympic tennis players of Norway
Tennis players at the 1920 Summer Olympics
Tennis players at the 1924 Summer Olympics
20th-century Norwegian women